Eryngium aristulatum, known by the common names California eryngo and Jepson's button celery, is a species of flowering plant in the family  Apiaceae.

Distribution
This plant is native to California and Baja California where it grows in wet places, such as vernal pools and flooded meadows. It is found in coast redwood forest, California mixed evergreen forest, California foothill oak woodland, yellow pine forest, chaparral, coastal sage scrub, coastal salt marsh, and wetland-riparian habitats.

Description

Leaves appear near the base and at nodes along the stem and are long and serrated to toothed.

The inflorescence holds rounded flowers with five to eight long, straight, spiky bracts which often have spiny edges and may grow nearly 3 centimeters long. The flower contains white petals and white or purple styles. The blooming period is June through August.

Varieties
Named varieties include:
Eryngium aristulatum var. aristulatum — California eryngo,  Jepson's button celery; primarily found in San Francisco Bay Area.
Eryngium aristulatum var. hooveri — Hoover's button celery,  Hoover's eryngo; native to the Southern California Coast Ranges; a state listed Critically endangered species.
Eryngium aristulatum var. parishii — San Diego button celery, San Diego eryngo; primarily found in vernal pools of Coastal sage scrub habitats within San Diego County; a state and federally listed Endangered species.

References

External links
 Calflora Database: Eryngium aristulatum (California eryngo,  Jepson's button celery)
Jepson eFlora (TJM2) treatment of Eryngium aristulatum
USDA Plants Profile for Eryngium aristulatum
UC CalPhotos gallery of Eryngium aristulatum (California eryngo)

aristulatum
Flora of California
Flora of Baja California
Taxa named by Willis Linn Jepson